Tuğba Koyuncu (née Karakaya; born February 16, 1991, in Kayseri, Turkey) is a Turkish middle-distance runner. She is a student of physical education and sports at the local Erciyes University. Karakaya was a member of the Fenerbahçe Athletics Club, where she was coached by Süleyman Altınok before she transferred to Enkaspor.

She was born to Kasım Karakaya, a restaurant employee, and his wife İkbal, who both have seven children. She is the older of two sisters. She began running at the age of 12.

She won a silver medal in 1500 m event at the 2011 European Athletics U23 Championships in Ostrava, Czech Republic.

Koyuncu competed at the 1500 m event at the 2012 Summer Olympics where she failed to reach the semifinals.

At the 2013 Mediterranean Games in Mersin, Turkey, she took two bronze medals, one in the 800 m and the other in the 1500 m event. At the 2013 Islamic Solidarity Games held in Palembang, Indonesia, Koyuncu won also a bronze medal in the 800 m event.

Achievements

References

External links
IAAF profile for Tuğba Karakaya

1991 births
Living people
Turkish female middle-distance runners
Fenerbahçe athletes
People from Kayseri
Enkaspor athletes
Olympic athletes of Turkey
Athletes (track and field) at the 2012 Summer Olympics
Mediterranean Games bronze medalists for Turkey
Athletes (track and field) at the 2013 Mediterranean Games
Mediterranean Games medalists in athletics
Islamic Solidarity Games competitors for Turkey
Islamic Solidarity Games medalists in athletics
20th-century Turkish sportswomen
21st-century Turkish sportswomen